Na Huna, born Choe Honggi (February 11, 1951), is a South Korean trot singer who debuted in 1966.

Introduction 
Na Huna is often referred to as the "Emperor of Trot" due to his charismatic personality and powerful voice. He was one of the country's most popular singers of the 1970s, alongside his rival Nam Jin. Na made international headlines in 2008 when he pulled down his pants on live television to dispel rumors that he had been castrated by a Japanese gangster. He is a legendary trot singer, and often appears on the KBS 1TV Golden Oldies.

Albums

Filmography

Television show

External links 
 Korean Wikipedia

References

Living people
1947 births
People from Busan
Trot singers
South Korean male singers